Mavis Chloe Rivers (19 May 1929 – 29 May 1992) was a Samoan and New Zealand jazz singer. She was born in Apia, Samoa, as one of thirteen children to a musical family. In 1954, she moved to the United States. She married Glicerio Reyes "David" Catingub, a Filipino singer and bass player, in that year, and they had two sons, Matt, a musician and arranger, and Reynaldo. She died in 1992 due to a stroke after a concert in Los Angeles, California. She was a nominee for the Grammy Award for Best New Artist in 1960.

Discography
 Take a Number (Capitol, 1959)
 The Simple Life (Capitol, 1960)
 Hooray for Love (Capitol, 1960)
 Swing Along with Mavis (Reprise, 1961)
 Mavis (Reprise, 1961)
 Mavis Meets Shorty with Shorty Rogers (Reprise, 1963)
 We Remember Mildred Bailey with Red Norvo (Vee Jay, 1965)
 It's a Good Day (Delos, 1984)

As guest
With Matt Catingub
 My Mommy and Me (Sea Breeze, 1983)
 Your Friendly Neighborhood Big Band (Reference, 1984)
 High Tech Big Band (Sea Breeze, 1985)
 I'm Getting Cement All Over You (Ewe) (Sea Breeze, 1991)

With others
 Alfred Newman, Ken Darby, Ports of Paradise (Capitol, 1960)
 Red Norvo, The Red Norvo Quintet (Studio West, 1990)

References

1929 births
1992 deaths
People from Apia
20th-century New Zealand  women  singers
Samoan emigrants to New Zealand
Samoan emigrants to the United States